Cementerio del Buceo is a cemetery in Montevideo, Uruguay. It was established in 1872.

It is located in the barrio of Buceo, near the shores of the River Plate. Nearby is the British Cemetery.

Notable burials
 Rafael Barradas (1890–1929) painter
 Esteban Echeverría (1805–1851) writer, poet and political figure
 Pedro Cubilla (1933–2007) professional football player and coach
 Juan José de Amézaga (1881–1956) President of Uruguay
 Juan Pablo Rebella (1974–2006) motion picture director
 Juan Alberto Schiaffino (1925–2002) footballer
Luisel Ramos (1984–2006) model

References

External links
 Cementerio del Buceo
 

Cemeteries in Montevideo
1872 establishments in Uruguay
Buceo